Stanmore is a rural locality in the Moreton Bay Region, Queensland, Australia. In the  Stanmore had a population of 437 people.

Geography 
The Stanley River passes through Stanmore and marks part of the northern boundary. Bellthorpe State Forest occupies a section of the north. Kilcoy–Beerwah Road runs through from south to north-east.

History
The locality derives its name from a grazing property Stanmore established by George Adophus Mason by 1875 and operated by him until his death in 1936.

Stanmore Provisional School opened in 1891. On 1 January 1909 it became Stanmore State School. It closed on 31 December 1972. The school was at 491-495 Kilcoy Beerwah Road.

In 1912 part of the Stanmore property was subdivided and sold.

The median age of the Stanmore population was 39 years, 2 years above the national median of 37.  86.5% of people living in Stanmore were born in Australia. The other top responses for country of birth were England 3.5%, United States of America 1.5%, Scotland 1%, Cambodia 0.8%, South Africa 0.8%.  95.6% of people spoke only English at home; the next most common languages were 0.6% Afrikaans, 0.6% Khmer, 0.6% Maltese, 0.6% Italian.

Education
There are no schools in Stanmore. The nearest government primary schools are Woodford State School in neighbouring Woodford to the south-east, Peachester State School in Peachester to the north-east, and Glass House Mountains State School in Glass House Mountains to the east. The nearest government secondary schools are Woodford State School in Woodford (to Year 10), Maleny State High School (to Year 12) in Maleny to the north-east, Beerwah State High School (to Year 12) in Beerwah to the east, and Kilcoy State High School (to Year 12) in Kilcoy to the south-west.

References

Suburbs of Moreton Bay Region
Localities in Queensland